Matteo Milli (born 22 April 1989) is an Italian swimmer. He competed in the men's 50 metre backstroke event at the 2017 World Aquatics Championships.

References

1989 births
Living people
Italian male swimmers
Place of birth missing (living people)
Mediterranean Games gold medalists for Italy
Mediterranean Games medalists in swimming
Swimmers at the 2013 Mediterranean Games
Italian male backstroke swimmers
21st-century Italian people